Holtek Semiconductor is a Taiwan-based semiconductor design centre and provider with its headquarters and design operations based in the Hsinchu Science Park in Taiwan, and has sales offices located in USA and India. Holtek's design focus is in both 32-bit and 8-bit along with Touch microcontroller development, and as of 2022 the firm employed 631 employees. Holtek also designs and provides peripheral semiconductor products such as remote control, telecommunication, power management, computer peripheral, and memory devices. Holtek's device application area is concentrated in the consumer product field such as household appliances, computer peripheral products, remote controllers, leisure products, medical equipment as well as industrial controllers. Holtek microcontrollers are in home appliances including brands such as Philips, Siemens, Märklin and Japanese brands such as Futaba and Sony.

History
Holtek Semiconductor was established as a design house in Taipei in 1983. From the design of remote control, telecom and voice/music devices, the company moved into microcontroller design. 

In 1988 the company moved to the Hsinchu Science Park under the name of Holtek Microelectronics and began also its combined manufacturing and design operations. 

In 1998 Holtek Semiconductor Inc. became a pure design house with its device manufacturing contracted out. The decision to move out of manufacturing and focus on only design reflected many similar companies.

Products

Holtek's design focus is in the area of microcontroller development. Holtek's 32-bit series is based on ARM Cortex-M0+ and Cortex-M3 cores. They are also producing 8051 based controllers, but the majority of their 8-bit microcontrollers are based on a core designed in-house that is very similar to the Microchip PIC16 architecture. All have common features such as timers, external interrupts, power-down functions, low-voltage reset, bi-directional I/O pins etc. The range of microcontrollers support clock speeds from 32 kHz up to 20 MHz. Device specific features include functions such as EEPROM memory, A/D converters, LCD interfaces, USB interfaces, operational amplifiers. Some of Holtek's 8-bit and 32-bit microcontroller devices:

 HT32F51XX ARM M3 core based 32-bit series
 HT85F22XX 8051 core based 8-bit series
 HT46RXX A/D type series
 HT46FXX Flash A/D type series
 HT48RXX I/O type series
 HT48FXX Flash I/O type series
 HT49XX LCD type series
 HT56RXX Tiny Power A/D type series
 HT66FXX Flash A/D type series
 HT68FXX Flash I/O type series
 HT82XX Computer Peripheral series
 HT95XX Telecom Peripheral series
 BS8XXX Touch IC series
Holtek  develops other devices, most of which could be classified as microcontroller peripheral devices. One area is that of Low Dropout Regulators where Holtek has provided a range of products with low supply currents. Holtek supports traditional products such as remote control and telecommunication devices. Some peripheral products include:

HT7XX Power Management Devices
HT93X/24X Memory Products
HT12X Remote Control Devices
HT16XX Display Drivers
HT9XX Telecom Peripherals

Holtek Semiconductor devices are used in home appliances, computer peripheral equipment, home medical equipment market. The company also provides a design service for customers with specific microcontroller needs. These special microcontroller devices may integrate functions such as smart card interface or medical analog circuitry within the microcontroller.

Development tools

Holtek also supplies its IDE-3000 development system to support its microcontroller devices. This is a suite of hardware and software development tools which includes real time hardware emulation and software simulation as well as tools for device programming of OTP and flash type devices. Some of Holtek's ICE In-Circuit Emulators also include an integrated device programmer eliminating the need for separate programming tools. The separate programming tools can be operated in a stand-alone mode without a PC connection.

References

See also
 List of companies of Taiwan
 Instruction listings for Holtek 8-bit processors with 14 or 16 bit instructions

1983 establishments in Taiwan
Microcontroller companies
Electronics companies of Taiwan
Companies based in Hsinchu
Electronics companies established in 1983
Taiwanese brands